Mátyás Plachy (24 May 1930 – 28 June 1993) was a Hungarian boxer. He competed in the men's middleweight event at the 1952 Summer Olympics.

References

1930 births
1993 deaths
Hungarian male boxers
Olympic boxers of Hungary
Boxers at the 1952 Summer Olympics
Boxers from Budapest
Middleweight boxers